Avigdor Moskowitz (born 4 February 1953) is a former Israeli basketball player, playing as a point guard.

He was a member of the Israeli national basketball team, which won a gold medal at 1974 Asian Games after defeating South Korea 92–85 in a final match. He represented his country four times in the European Championships and in 1979 he won a silver medal.

References 

Israeli men's basketball players
Medalists at the 1974 Asian Games
Asian Games gold medalists for Israel
Asian Games medalists in basketball
Basketball players at the 1974 Asian Games
1953 births
Living people
Point guards